Streptococcus peroris is a species of Streptococcus. In Foods, S. peroris was firstly reported in Tarhana (Fermented Turkish Food) by researchers.

References

External links
 Type strain of Streptococcus peroris at BacDive -  the Bacterial Diversity Metadatabase

Streptococcaceae
Gram-positive bacteria